Prince of Peace may refer to:

In religion 
 "Prince of Peace" in Isaiah 9 in the Book of Isaiah in the Hebrew Bible or the Old Testament of the Christian Bible
interpreted by Christians as a Christian messianic prophecy referring to Jesus Christ
interpreted by Jews in other ways as Pele-joez-el-gibbor-abi-ad-sar-shalom

Churches and religious establishments
Prince of Peace Lutheran Church, Woodridge, Illinois, U.S.
St. Vincent de Paul Catholic Church (Mobile, Alabama), now known as Prince of Peace Church
Prince of Peace Votive Church, Nombre de Dios (mission), St. Augustine, Florida, U.S.
Tigoni Conventual Priory (the Prince of Peace Conventual Priory), Tigoni, Nairobi Province, Kenya
Prince of Peace Abbey in Oceanside, California, U.S, founded by St. Meinrad Archabbey

Schools and colleges
Prince of Peace Preparatory, a school in Clinton, Iowa, U.S.
and 2 other schools in Iowa
Prince of Peace Lutheran College, Everton Hills, North Brisbane, Australia
 Prince Of Peace Academy, parish of Mother of God Roman Catholic Church (Covington, Kentucky)
 Prince of Peace Catholic Church and School, a school in Hoover, Alabama, U.S.
 Prince of Peace Catholic Schools, former names for Shawe Memorial High School and Pope John XXIII Elementary, Madison, Indiana. U.S.
 Prince of Peace Catholic School, a grade school in Plano, Texas, U.S.
 Prince of Peace Catholic School, a grade school in Taylors, South Carolina, U.S.
 Prince of Peace Catholic School, an elementary school in Toronto, Ontario, Canada.
 Prince of Peace Christian School, a K-12 school is Plano, Texas, U.S.

Music
 Prince of Peace, 1969 album by Johnny Nash
Prince of Peace: Radio Broadcast 1970, album by Leon Russell
 "Prince of Peace", single from 2016 album Of Dirt and Grace: Live from the Land by Hillsong United
 "Prince of Peace", song by Crowbar (Canadian band)
 "Prince of Peace", track on 2007 album Ilembe by Ladysmith Black Mambazo
 "Prince of Peace", track on 1973 album Izipho Zam (My Gifts) by Pharoah Sanders
 "Prince of Peace", track by Paul Revere & the Raiders from their 1971 album Indian Reservation

Other uses 
Prince of the Peace (title), a non-hereditary title in the peerage of Spain
The Lawton Story of The Prince of Peace, a 1948 American film 
Prince of Peace, 2003 portrait by Akiane
Prince of Peace, novel by James Carroll (author) (born 1943)
Prince of Peace, a book by Isabella Macdonald Alden

See also
Princess of Peace (disambiguation)
Missa Princeps Pacis (Mass Prince of Peace), a mass composed by William Lloyd Webber in 1962

Hebrew Bible words and phrases